Joseph Merle Lansden (1907-1989) was an American attorney, judge and politician from the U.S. state of Oklahoma. Lansden was the first district judge under a new system of appointment. He was also a Speaker of the Oklahoma House of Representatives.

Early life and education
Lansden was born in Beaver County, Oklahoma, on July 8, 1907. He earned his law degree from the University of Oklahoma Law School and was admitted to the bar in 1939.

Military service
Lansden served in the United States Marine Corps from 1942 to 1946 and was discharged with the rank of major.

Oklahoma House of Representatives
Lansden served three terms as a member of the Oklahoma House of Representatives from Beaver County between 1941 and 1947. He served as speaker during a special session of the state legislature in 1944, when Speaker Harold Freeman was undergoing military service. The special session was called by the Governor Robert S. Kerr to ensure military men and women could participate in the 1944 elections. Lansden's appointment was contentious and a minor revolt ended when he fainted due to exhaustion from travel and earned the sympathy of his fellow legislators.

Law firm
Lansden joined the firm of Lansden, Drum, and Goetzinger after finishing his military service until his appointment as a district judge.

District judge
Lansden was appointed by Governor Dewey Bartlett to serve as a district judget of the 1st Judicial District of Oklahoma. He was the first appointment under a new system in which a commission provided judicial appointees to the governor, who then made his or her selection. After his appointment, he was elected twice without opposition, serving until July 1977.

Death
Lansden died October 30, 1989, in Norman, Oklahoma.

References

1907 births
1989 deaths
20th-century American politicians
Speakers of the Oklahoma House of Representatives
Democratic Party members of the Oklahoma House of Representatives
People from Beaver County, Oklahoma
University of Oklahoma College of Law alumni